KSBS-CD, virtual channel 10 (UHF digital channel 19), is a low-power, Class A television station licensed to Denver, Colorado, United States. It is a translator of Sterling-licensed independent station KCDO-TV (channel 3) which is owned by the Cincinnati-based E. W. Scripps Company; it is also sister to Denver-licensed ABC affiliate KMGH-TV (channel 7). KSBS-CD's transmitter is located atop Lookout Mountain, near Golden; its parent station shares studios with KMGH-TV on East Speer Boulevard in Denver's Congress Park neighborhood.

History
The license history begins with the establishment of K13OI in Estes Park Estates, which was a translator for NBC affiliate KUSA-TV. The station was acquired by GreenTV Corporation, which owned KSBS-TV in Steamboat Springs, in 1995, and moved to channel 18 in Denver as K18FI; it later shifted to channel 67 and later 47, as KSBS-LP, one of two low-power stations bringing Telemundo to Denver.

In 2006, NBC Universal, which had acquired KSBS-TV and KSBS-LP in 2001, bought KDEN-TV in Longmont and relocated Telemundo there; it then donated KSBS-TV to Rocky Mountain PBS and sold KSBS-LP, which was by then a Class A station, to Denver Digital Television. Under Denver Digital ownership, KSBS-LP received a $23,000 fine for omissions in its public file in 2013. Denver Digital sold KSBS to KCDO-TV in 2014, at which time it became a simulcast to bring KCDO's signal into the Denver metropolitan area.

On September 22, 2020, the E. W. Scripps Company announced it was buying KSBS-CD and KCDO-TV for an undisclosed price, pending approval of the Federal Communications Commission (FCC); this would make them sister stations to KMGH-TV. The sale was completed on November 20.

Subchannels
The station's digital signal is multiplexed:

See also
KCDO-TV

References

External links

SBS-CD
Independent television stations in the United States
TheGrio affiliates
Local Now affiliates
Low-power television stations in the United States

E. W. Scripps Company television stations